The  doubles Tournament at the 2005 Qatar Total German Open took place between May 2 and May 8 on the outdoor clay courts of the Rot-Weiss Tennis Club in Berlin, Germany. Elena Likhovtseva and Vera Zvonareva won the title, defeating Cara Black and Liezel Huber in the final.

Seeds

Draw

Finals

Top half

Bottom half

References
 Main Draw

Qatar Total German Open - Doubles
WTA German Open